Diplacus congdonii is a species of monkeyflower known by the common name Congdon's monkeyflower.

Distribution
It is endemic to California, where it has a scattered and localized distribution in the mountains and foothills between the North Coast Ranges and the Peninsular Ranges, and the Sierra Nevada foothills. It grows in moist spots on slopes and in canyons, sometimes in disturbed areas.

Description
Diplacus congdonii is a small, hairy annual herb producing a thin, erect stem no more than 10 centimeters tall. The herbage is purple-green in color. The paired opposite leaves are oval in shape, lined with hairs, and up to about 3 centimeters long. The plant bears narrow-throated, trumpet-shaped magenta flowers 1 to 3 centimeters long.

References

External links
Jepson Manual Treatment - Mimulus congdonii
USDA Plants Profile: Mimulus congdonii
Mimulus congdonii - Photo gallery

congdonii
Endemic flora of California
Flora of the Sierra Nevada (United States)
Natural history of the San Francisco Bay Area
Natural history of the Peninsular Ranges
Natural history of the Transverse Ranges
Plants described in 1891
Flora without expected TNC conservation status